Guerrilla warfare during the American Civil War (1861–1865) was a form of warfare characterized by ambushes, surprise raids, and irregular styles of combat. Waged by both sides of the conflict, it gathered in intensity as the war dragged on and had a profound impact on the outcome of the Civil War.

Background 
Guerrilla warfare in the American Civil War followed the same general patterns of irregular warfare conducted in 19th century Europe. Structurally, they can be divided into three different types of operations: the so-called 'people's war', 'partisan warfare', and 'raiding warfare'. Each had distinct characteristics that were common practice during the war.

Operations

People's war 
The concept of a 'people's war,' first described by Clausewitz in his classic treatise On War, was the closest example of a mass guerrilla movement in the 19th century. In general during the American Civil War, this type of irregular warfare was conducted in the hinterland of the border states (Missouri, Arkansas, Tennessee, Kentucky, and northwestern Virginia / West Virginia). It was marked by a vicious quality of neighbors fighting each other as other grudges got settled. It was frequent for residents of one part of a single county to take up arms against their counterparts in the rest of the vicinity.  Bushwhacking, murder, assault, and terrorism were characteristics of this kind of fighting. Few participants wore uniforms or were formally mustered into the actual armies. In many cases, civilians fought against civilians or civilians fought against opposing enemy troops.

One such example was the opposing irregular forces operating in Missouri and northern Arkansas from 1862 to 1865, most of which were pro-Confederate or pro-Union in name only.  They preyed on civilians and isolated military forces of both sides with little regard for politics. From the semiorganized guerrillas, several groups formed and were given some measure of legitimacy by their governments. Quantrill's Raiders, who terrorized pro-Union civilians and fought Federal troops in large areas of Missouri and Kansas, was one such unit.  Another notorious unit, with debatable ties to the Confederate military, was led by Champ Ferguson along the Kentucky-Tennessee border, who became one of the few figures of the Confederate cause to be executed after the war.  Dozens of other small, localized bands terrorized the countryside throughout the border region during the war, bringing total war to the area that lasted until the end of the Civil War and, in some areas, beyond.

Partisan warfare 
Partisan warfare, in contrast, more closely resembled commando operations of the 20th century. Partisans were small units of conventional forces, controlled and organized by a military force for operations behind enemy lines. The 1862 Partisan Ranger Act, passed by the Confederate Congress, authorized the formation of such units and gave them legitimacy, which placed them in a different category from the common 'bushwhacker' or 'guerrilla'. John Singleton Mosby formed a partisan unit (the 43rd Battalion) that was very effective in tying down Union forces behind their lines in northern Virginia in the last two years of the war. Groups such as Blazer's Scouts, White's Comanches, the Loudoun Rangers, McNeill's Rangers, and other similar forces at times served in the formal armies, but they often were loosely organized and operated more as partisans than as cavalry, especially early in the war.

Raiding warfare 

Lastly, deep raids by conventional cavalry forces were often considered 'irregular' in nature. The "Partisan Brigades" of Nathan Bedford Forrest and John Hunt Morgan operated as part of the cavalry forces of the Confederate Army of Tennessee in 1862 and 1863. They were given specific missions to destroy logistical hubs, railroad bridges, and other strategic targets to support the greater mission of the Army of Tennessee. Morgan led raids into Kentucky as well. In his last raid, he violated orders by going across the Ohio River and raiding in Ohio and Indiana as well since he wanted to bring the war to the North. The long raid diverted thousands of Union troops. Morgan captured and paroled nearly 6,000 troops, destroyed bridges and fortifications, and ran off livestock. By mid-1863, Morgan's Raiders had been mostly destroyed in the late days of the Great Raid of 1863.

Some of his followers continued under their own direction, such as Marcellus Jerome Clarke, who kept on with raids in Kentucky. The Confederacy conducted few deep cavalry raids in the latter years of the war, mostly because of the losses in experienced horsemen and the offensive operations of the Union Army.  Federal cavalry conducted several successful raids during the war but in general used their cavalry forces in a more conventional role. A good exception was the 1863 Grierson's Raid, which did much to set the stage for General Ulysses Grant's victory during the Vicksburg Campaign.

Counterinsurgency 
Counterinsurgency operations were successful in reducing the impact of Confederate guerrilla warfare. In Arkansas, Union forces used a wide variety of strategies to defeat irregulars. They included the use of Arkansas Unionist forces as anti-guerrilla troops, the use of riverine forces such as gunboats to control the waterways, and the provost marshal's military law enforcement system to spy on suspected guerrillas and to imprison those who were captured. Against Confederate raiders, the Union army developed an effective cavalry itself and reinforced that system by numerous blockhouses and fortification to defend strategic targets.

However, Union attempts to defeat Mosby's Partisan Rangers fell short of success because of Mosby's use of very small units (10–15 men) that operated in areas that were considered to be friendly to the Confederates. Another regiment, known as Thomas' Legion, had white and anti-Union Cherokee Indians, morphed into a guerrilla force and continued fighting in the remote mountain back-country of western North Carolina for a month after Robert E. Lee's surrender at Appomattox Court House. That unit was never completely suppressed by Union forces, but it voluntarily ceased hostilities after capturing the town of Waynesville, North Carolina, on May 10, 1865.

Aftermath 
In the late 20th century, several historians focused on the Confederate government's decision to not use guerrilla warfare to prolong the war. Near the end of the war, some in the Confederate administration who advocated continuing the fight as a guerrilla conflict. Such efforts were opposed by Confederate generals such as Lee, who ultimately believed that surrender and reconciliation were the best options for the war-ravaged South.

Notable guerrillas

See also 

 Bushwhackers - (Confederate)
 Jayhawkers - (Union)
 Partisan rangers - (Confederate)

Primary sources
 U.S. War Department, The War of the Rebellion: A Compilation of the Official Records of the Union and Confederate Armies, 70 volumes in 4 series. Washington, D.C.: United States Government Printing Office, 1880–1901.
 Lowell Hayes Harrison, James c. Klotter, A New History of Kentucky, Lexington, KY: University Press of Kentucky, 1997

Further reading 

 
 Beckett, Ian Frederick William. Encyclopedia of guerrilla warfare (ABC-Clio, 1999)
 Beilein, Joseph M. and Matthew Christopher Hulbert, eds. The Civil War Guerrilla: Unfolding the Black Flag in History, Memory, and Myth. Lexington: University Press of Kentucky, 2015. .
 Browning, Judkin. Shifting Loyalties: The Union Occupation of Eastern North Carolina (Univ of North Carolina Press, 2011)
 Fellman, Michael. Inside War: The Guerrilla Conflict in Missouri During the American Civil War (Oxford University Press, 1989)
 Gallagher, Gary W. "Disaffection, Persistence, and Nation: Some Directions in Recent Scholarship on the Confederacy." Civil War History 55#3 (2009) pp: 329–353.
 Grant, Meredith Anne. "Internal Dissent: East Tennessee's Civil War, 1849-1865." (thesis 2008). online
 Hulbert, Matthew Christopher. "Constructing Guerrilla Memory: John Newman Edwards and Missouri's Irregular Lost Cause," Journal of the Civil War Era. 2, No. 1 (March 2012), 58–81.
 Hulbert, Matthew Christopher. The Ghosts of Guerrilla Memory: How Civil War Bushwhackers Became Gunslingers in the American West. Athens: University of Georgia Press, 2016. .
 Hulbert, Matthew Christopher. "How to Remember'This Damnable Guerrilla Warfare': Four Vignettes from Civil War Missouri," Civil War History. 59, No. 2 (June 2013), 142–167.
 Hulbert, Matthew Christopher. "The Rise and Fall of Edwin Terrell, Guerrilla Hunter, U.S.A.," Ohio Valley History. 18, No. 3 (Fall 2018), 42–61.
 Mackey, Robert R. The Uncivil War: Irregular Warfare in the Upper South, 1861-1865 (University of Oklahoma Press, 2014 reprint)
 Mountcastle, Clay. Punitive War: Confederate Guerrillas and Union Reprisals (University Press of Kansas, 2009)
 Nichols, Bruce, Guerrilla Warfare in Civil War Missouri, McFarland & Co. Inc., 2006. .
 Sutherland, Daniel E. A Savage Conflict: The Decisive Role of Guerrillas in the American Civil War (Univ of North Carolina Press, 2009)
 Vaughan, Virginia C. Tennessee County Historical Series: Weakley County (Memphis State University Press, 1983)
 Williams, David. Bitterly Divided: The South's Inner Civil War (The New Press, 2010)

External links 

 "Guerilla Warfare in Kentucky" — Article by Civil War historian/author Bryan S. Bush

 
Guerrilla warfare
Military history of the Confederate States of America
Military operations of the American Civil War